The Engineer Souza Dias Dam, formerly known as the Jupiá Dam, is an embankment dam on the Paraná River near Três Lagoas in Mato Grosso do Sul, Brazil. It was constructed for hydroelectric power production, flood control and navigation. Studies on the dam and power plant began in 1951 which recommended the dam along with the Ilha Solteira Dam. The dam was inaugurated in 1968 and its generators were commissioned between 1969 and 1974.

Dam and reservoir

It was inaugurated January 1998.

Power station
In addition, the power station contains two  service generators for powering the dam's facilities itself.

See also

 List of power stations in Brazil

References

Dams completed in 1968
Dams in São Paulo (state)
Dams on the Paraná River
Embankment dams
Locks of Brazil
Dams in Mato Grosso do Sul